In mathematics, the Ahlfors conjecture, now a theorem, states that the limit set of a finitely-generated Kleinian group is either the whole Riemann sphere, or has measure 0. 

 also showed that in the case when the limit set is the whole sphere, the action of the Kleinian group on the limit set is ergodic.

References

Kleinian groups
Theorems in analysis
Conjectures that have been proved